"For the First Time" is a 1996 song performed by Kenny Loggins from the 1996 film One Fine Day starring Michelle Pfeiffer and George Clooney with music and lyrics by James Newton Howard, Jud J. Friedman, and Allan Dennis Rich and produced by Peter Asher. The song was included in the soundtrack of the film and is Loggins' one and only number one hit on the Adult Contemporary chart, remaining on the top spot for two weeks. It also peaked at number sixty on the Billboard Hot 100 Airplay chart. The song did not make the Billboard Hot 100 chart as it was not made available as a commercial single, which at that time made it ineligible to chart on the Hot 100. "For the First Time" was nominated for the Best Original Song.

"For the First Time" was first released by Rod Stewart on his album If We Fall in Love Tonight, a month prior to the release of Loggins' version.

Music video
The song's accompanying music video shows Loggins singing the song in a giant manor house and an empty theater on a rainy night, interspliced with scenes from the movie. It ends with Loggins walking down a street in heavy rain. This is the first Kenny Loggins video to feature the singer without his trademark facial hair as he shaved them in the 1996 prior to the filming of the video.

Other versions
In 2008, KC Concepcion sang her version of the song from the 2008 film of the same title released by Star Cinema with her co-star Richard Gutierrez. In 1999, Steve Wariner recorded the song for his album Two Teardrops.

Charts

References

1996 songs
1996 singles
1990s ballads
Kenny Loggins songs
Rod Stewart songs
Pop ballads
Songs written for films
Songs written by James Newton Howard
Columbia Records singles
Song recordings produced by Peter Asher